Destruction may refer to:

Concepts 
 Destruktion, a term from the philosophy of Martin Heidegger
 Destructive narcissism, a pathological form of narcissism
 Self-destructive behaviour, a widely used phrase that conceptualises certain kinds of destructive acts as belonging to the self
 Slighting, the deliberate destruction of a building
 Final destruction (End of the World)

Comics and gaming
 Destruction (DC Comics), one of the Endless in Neil Gaiman's comic book series The Sandman
 Destructoid, a video-game blog

Music
 Destruction (band), a German thrash metal band
 Destruction (EP), a 1994 EP by Destruction
 "Destruction" (song), a 2015 song by Joywave
 "Destruction", a 1984 song by Loverboy featured in Giorgio Moroder’s restoration of the film Metropolis
 "The Destruction", a song from the 1988 musical Carrie

Television and film
 "Destruction" (UFO), a 1970 episode of UFO
 Destruction (film), a 1915 film starring Theda Bara

Other uses
 Destruction Bay, Yukon, Canada
 NJPW Destruction, professional wrestling event

See also 
 Destroyed (disambiguation)
 Destroy (disambiguation)
 Damage (disambiguation)